Armada maritima is a moth of the family Noctuidae first described by Brandt in 1939. It is found in Saudi Arabia, Oman, the United Arab Emirates and Israel.

There are multiple generations per year. Adults are on wing year round except August and September.

External links

Image

Armadini
Moths of the Middle East
Moths of the Arabian Peninsula